This is a list of notable people from Brantford, Ontario, Canada.

Military
William Landymore, Commander Maritime Command (1964–1966)
Percy W. Nelles, Chief of the Naval Staff (RCN) (1934–1944)
Geoffrey Walsh, Commander of the Canadian Army (1961–1965)

Film and television
Andrea Brooks, actress
Phil Hartman, Canadian-American actor
Shelley Niro, producer and director
Michelle Nolden
Jay Silverheels, actor; known for the role of Tonto on The Lone Ranger

Literature and journalism
June Callwood, author and journalist
Thomas B. Costain, author and journalist
Sara Jeannette Duncan, author and journalist
Pauline Johnson (also known in Mohawk as Tekahionwake), aboriginal poet
 John B. Lee, poet
Marsha Skrypuch, author

Science
Alexander Graham Bell, inventor of the telephone
James Hillier, inventor of electron microscope

The arts
Blanche Crozier, stage actress
Lawren Harris, founder of the Group of Seven
Wade Hemsworth, songwriter
Paul Kneale, artist
Casey Mecija and Jennifer Mecija, musicians (Ohbijou)
Shelley Niro, photographer and installation artist
Lonnie Szoke, musician and songwriter

Politics
Alfred Apps, President, Liberal Party of Canada
Henry Cockshutt, Lieutenant Governor of Ontario of Ontario
Phil Gillies, Member of the Legislative Assembly and Cabinet Minister
Arthur Sturgis Hardy, Premier of Ontario (1896–1899)
Dave Levac, Speaker of the Legislative Assembly of Ontario and MPP for the electoral riding of Brant
William Ross Macdonald, PC, OC, CD, QC (1891–1976), served as the 21st Lieutenant Governor of Ontario (1968–1974); Speaker of the House of Commons of Canada (1949–1953)
Lawrence Pennell, Solicitor General of Canada (1965–1968); Ontario Supreme Court Judge (1968–1985)
David Reville, Member of the Legislative Assembly for Riverdale, 1985–90
Jane Stewart PC,  served as MP and federal cabinet minister (Minister of Human Resources)

Sportspeople

Ice hockey players

Bill Cook, right winger and coach
Bryan Fogarty, defenceman
Dave Gans, centre
Gerry Gray, goaltender
Chris Gratton, centre
Dan Gratton, centre
Josh Gratton, left winger
Brent Gretzky, centre
Keith Gretzky, centre and former interim general manager of the Edmonton Oilers
Wayne Gretzky, centre; considered one of the best NHL players of all time
Len Hachborn, centre; childhood friend of Wayne Gretzky
Adam Henrique, centre
Pat Hickey, left winger
Doug Jarvis, forward, coach, and senior advisor to the Vancouver Canucks
Keith Jones, now a sportscaster
Brandon Montour, defenceman
Chris Pusey, goaltender and defenceman
Jeff Reese, now goalie coach with the Philadelphia Flyers
Greg Stefan, goaltender and goaltending coach for the Flint Firebirds
Paul Szczechura, forward

Other sports

Mike Beres, Olympic badminton player
Aaron Carpenter, rugby union player
David Hearn, golfer
Julie Howard, Olympic swimmer
Tanya Hunks, Olympic swimmer
Nick Kaczur, American football player
Jacqueline Legere, Ice Cross Downhill
Tom Longboat, distance runner
Rob Pikula, Canadian football player
Kevin Sullivan, Olympic runner
Jordan Szoke, professional superbike racer
Bill Watkins, manager in Major League Baseball

References

Brantford
Brantford, Canada